New York City's 28th City Council district is one of 51 districts in the New York City Council. It has been represented by Democrat Adrienne Adams since 2017, succeeding fellow Democrat Ruben Wills.

Geography 
District 28 covers a series of predominantly Black neighborhoods in southeastern Queens, including some or all of Richmond Hill, Jamaica, South Ozone Park, and Rochdale Village. Much of John F. Kennedy International Airport is located in the district, as is Baisley Pond Park.

The district overlaps with Queens Community Boards 9, 10, and 12, and is contained entirely within New York's 5th congressional district. It also overlaps with the 10th, 14th, and 15th districts of the New York State Senate, and with the 24th, 31st, 32nd, and 38th districts of the New York State Assembly.

Recent election results

2021 
In 2019, voters in New York City approved Ballot Question 1, which implemented ranked-choice voting in all local elections. Under the new system, voters have the option to rank up to five candidates for every local office. Voters whose first-choice candidates fare poorly will have their votes redistributed to other candidates in their ranking until one candidate surpasses the 50 percent threshold. If one candidate surpasses 50 percent in first-choice votes, then ranked-choice tabulations will not occur.

2017

2013

References 

New York City Council districts